Nikollë Nikprelaj (born 16 May 1960) is an Albanian singer from Tuzi, Montenegro. Nikolle began his professional career in his late teens. He is now the lead singer for the Albanian folk group "Besa Trieshit", which has won first place in Albanian concerts and festivals in Montenegro, Kosovo and Albania. Nikprelaj plays several traditional instruments, including the lahuta, çiftelia, sharkia, and the bylbyli (flute). He plays traditional Albanian music featuring his instruments and vocals.

Nikprelaj took second place in the song contest Polifestit 2008 and the RTV21 award for his song "Syrin mos ia shkel" (translated "Eye Not to Tread").  He also performs concerts to provide humanitarian aid to organizations benefiting children with special needs.

Discography

Albums
  Në maje t'bjeshkëve të Malësisë ('On top of the mountains of Malësia')
  Oj Lulja e Malësisë ('Oh flower of Malësia', referring to a girl)
  Dora e pajtimit ('The hands of conformism')
  Nuk kem tjetër vec një nënë ('We don't have no other, but one mother')
  Endërra ime ('My dream')
  U knoft hymni gjithëkombëtar ('May the national anthem be sung to all its natives')
  Fukaraja ('Poor person', referring to poor in love)
  Pa titull ('Without a title')
  Çlirimtarët kokë për tokë ('Liberators' heads to the ground')
  Folk 2000 ('Folk 2000')
  Ti s'ke shpirt ('You don't have a soul')
  Live ('Live')
  Ndal ('Stop')
  Kangë dhe Potpuri Dasmash ('Wedding Songs and Mix') (2009)
  Hidhe Vallen ('Jump Dance') (2010)
  Ani, Ani ('Ok, Ok') (2012)
  Dasma Jonë ('Our Wedding') (2013)
  Këngë e Atmosferë ('Songs and Atmosphere') (2014)
Zemren Ma Ke Thy (2018)

References

External links 
Nikollë Nikprelaj - Koleksion kengesh (Biography and discography at Illyrian.com) (Albanian)
Koncerte Humanitare të Nikollë Nikprelaj - Kënga ndihmon fëmijët me nevoja të posaçme (Malesia Forum) (Albanian)
Nata e dytë e “Polifestit 2008”: Violetë Kukaj merr çmimin e parë (Kosova Sot) (Albanian)

Living people
Albanians in Montenegro
Albanian Roman Catholics
20th-century Montenegrin people
21st-century Montenegrin people
People from Tuzi
Montenegrin expatriates in Albania
1961 births